Anna Bogren (born 3 February 1965) is a Swedish orienteering competitor.  She won the 1993 Short distance World Orienteering Championships, and finished third in 1995. She is two times Relay World Champion, from 1993 and 1997, and has a silver medal from 1995, as member of the Swedish winning teams.

References

External links

1965 births
Living people
Swedish orienteers
Female orienteers
Foot orienteers
World Orienteering Championships medalists
20th-century Swedish women